Myyrmanni is a shopping center located at the Myyrmäki suburb of Vantaa, Finland. The center was built in the early 1990s and it has over 90 stores and 1,100 parking spaces. The main tenants of the shopping center include S-market, Alko, H&M, Lindex, Clas Ohlson, Tokmanni and Burger King.

From the center of Helsinki Myyrmanni is best reached by bus 411 or by P-train to Myyrmäki Station located next to the mall.

Myyrmanni was the site of a bombing on October 11, 2002. 7 people were killed.

In 2010 the Mall attempted to improve the customer flow to the second floor as there were queues at the landscape lifts and the steel car lifts were ignored. Kone Lifts turned the elevators into a Hall of Fame for the 'Incredibles' comic strip characters. Making their Elevators more attractive to the public solved the people flow problem. This practical case of service design thinking is used in literature as an example of extending products into services.

References

External links

Shopping centres in Vantaa